Gia Skova (born July 13, 1991) is a European actress and model, now living in the United States. She has appeared on numerous fashion magazine covers around the world, adorned the runway for designers such as Stella McCartney and Marc Jacobs, been featured in print and commercial advertisements for internationally recognized brands such as L'Oreal and Red Bull, and been cast in television series, films and theatrical productions.

Biography 
Skova was born in eastern Europe on July 13, 1991. She was discovered as an actress at age 12 and for the next three years, starred in several television series.

At 15, Skova won the modeling contest "The Beauty of the Volga", which launched her professional modeling career. She was a teen supermodel in Moscow by age 16, winning many awards such as Ms. Saratov, Ms. FHM, Ms. Fashion Style and Ms. Great Volga. The Italian modeling agency Modus signed her and Skova worked in several large projects in Italy, France, Spain, and a number of Asian countries. Still in her teens, Skova also starred in several plays in Moscow, winning acting awards such as Best Theatrical Actress of Saratov, and 2009's Best Actress of Moscow Theater.

In 2011, Skova presented the photo galleries of All-Time Bar located in the center of the Russian capital with her photo shoot by photographer Ash Gupta in Spain. She has since been a cover girl or been featured in Vogue, InStyle, Vanity Fair, Esquire, GQ and Cosmopolitan, among others.

In 2012, Skova moved to the United States to continue her career as a model and actress.

During 2012–13, Gia Skova filmed several movies and signed for several more including a Sci-Fi trilogy. She also starred in a Sci-Fi TV pilot called "Starship Orion", scheduled for a 2014 release. Skova portrayed also  Victoria Cougar in the Slasher film Muck.

In June 2021 she released the action film The Serpent, which is produced, directed and started by her.

Filmography

Film

TV Series

See also 
 Дональда Сазерленда позвали в фильм о расследовании убийства Политковской 
 Джиа Скова раскрыла секрет «Невинности мусульман». Актеров подкупали обещанием всемирной славы 
 Miss COED: Gia Skova 
 «Пустая болтовня» Гули Сковородиной 
 Политические убеждения голливудской звезды останутся за кадром

References

External links

Gia Skova cover and feature in "Spirit & Flesh" http://spiritandfleshmag.com/fashion/wrath/
Gia Skova interview http://www.eeriedigest.com/wordpress/2011/12/taem-interview-with-modelactress-gia-skova/

Living people
1991 births
Actors from Saratov
21st-century Russian actresses
Russian film actresses